Pearl Sagar OBE (born 1958, Belfast, Northern Ireland) is a former politician in Northern Ireland.

Brought up a Protestant, Sagar became a social worker in East Belfast, and married a soldier in the British Army.

In 1996, she joined with Monica McWilliams in petitioning established political parties to include women among their candidates for the Northern Ireland Forum. After receiving little response, they founded the Northern Ireland Women's Coalition, to stand in the election themselves. Sagar was second on the party's list in East Belfast, but failed to be elected. However, as the party took ninth place overall in the election, it was entitled to two top-up seats, which Sagar received as the second on the Northern Ireland-wide list.

Sagar stood unsuccessfully for Belfast City Council in 1997, and she was again unsuccessful in East Belfast in the 1998 Northern Ireland Assembly election.
 Following her defeat, she became a consultant to the Vital Voices project.

She was made an OBE in the New Year's Honours.

References

1958 births
Living people
British social workers
Members of the Northern Ireland Forum
Officers of the Order of the British Empire
Politicians from Belfast
Women in the politics of Northern Ireland
Date of birth missing (living people)
Northern Ireland Women's Coalition politicians
20th-century politicians from Northern Ireland